Phavaraea is a genus of moths of the family Notodontidae erected by Francis Walker in 1854. It consists of the following species:
Phavaraea dilatata (Walker, 1854)
Phavaraea poliana (Druce, 1893)
Phavaraea rectangularis (Toulgoët & Navatte, 1997)
Phavaraea rejecta (Geyer, 1832)

References

Notodontidae of South America